The 2015–16 Hartford Hawks women's basketball team will represent the University of Hartford during the 2015–16 NCAA Division I women's basketball season. The Hawks were led by seventeenth year Women's Basketball Hall of Fame head coach Jennifer Rizzotti and will once again play their home games in the Chase Arena at Reich Family Pavilion and were members of the America East Conference. They finished the season 11–19, 7–9 in America East play to finish in sixth place. They lost in the quarterfinals of the America East women's tournament to Stony Brook.

On April 15, 2016, it was announced that Rizzotti had resigned from Hartford and accepted the coaching position at George Washington. She finished at Hartford with a 17-year record of 316–200.

Media
All home games and conference road games will stream on either ESPN3 or AmericaEast.tv. Most road games will stream on the opponents website. All games will be broadcast on the radio on WWUH.

Roster

Schedule

|-
!colspan=9 style="background:#; color:#FFFFFF;"| Non-conference regular season

|-
!colspan=9 style="background:#; color:#FFFFFF;"| America East regular season

|-
!colspan=9 style="background:#; color:#FFFFFF;"| America East Women's Tournament

See also
2015–16 Hartford Hawks men's basketball team
Hartford Hawks women's basketball

References

Hartford Hawks women's basketball seasons
Hartford Hawks
Hartford Hawks
2015–16 America East Conference women's basketball season